Elaias Limen ( - literally, "Bay of Elaea"), also Elaea or Elaia (Ἐλαία), was a harbour town of Thesprotia in ancient Epirus at the mouth of the Acheron river.  The town is mentioned by both Scylax and Ptolemy. The Periplus of Pseudo-Scylax asserts that this was the main port of Thesprotia. The town's site is identified as near Cheimerion.

There is an archaeological site of the inland town of Elaea of which this was the harbour.

References

 Smith, William (editor); Dictionary of Greek and Roman Geography, "Acheron", London, (1854)
 Richard Talbert, Barrington Atlas of the Greek and Roman World,, p. 54

See also
List of cities in ancient Epirus

Populated places in ancient Epirus
Former populated places in Greece
Thesprotia